Na Hearadh agus Ceann a Deas Nan Loch (English: Harris and South Lewis) is one of the nine wards used to elect members of the Comhairle nan Eilean Siar. It elects three Councillors.

Councillors

Election Results

2017 Election
2017 Comhairle nan Eilean Siar election

2012 Election
2012 Comhairle nan Eilean Siar election

2007 Election
2007 Comhairle nan Eilean Siar election

References

Wards of Na h-Eileanan Siar